The first season of Quantum Leap ran on NBC from March 26 to May 17, 1989. The series follows the exploits of Dr. Sam Beckett and his Project Quantum Leap (PQL), through which he involuntarily leaps through spacetime, temporarily taking over a host in order to correct historical mistakes. Season one, a late-season replacement, consists of eight episodes.

The pilot episode, "Genesis (pt. 1)", won the series its first of three consecutive Primetime Emmy Awards for Outstanding Cinematography, while the episode "Double Identity" earned a Creative Arts Emmy Award for Outstanding Achievement in Hairstyling for a Series.

Episodes

References

Quantum Leap seasons
1989 American television seasons